The 2015 FAI Cup Final was the final match of the 2015 FAI Cup, the national association football cup of the Republic of Ireland. The match took place on 8 November 2015 at the Aviva Stadium in Dublin,  and was contested between Cork City and Dundalk.
Dundalk were looking to achieve the Double, having already won the league title.
	
		
The match was broadcast live on RTÉ Two and RTÉ Two HD in Ireland, and via the RTÉ Player worldwide.

The match finished scoreless in normal time, but a goal from Richie Towell in extra-time, from a Daryl Horgan pass, was enough to win the Cup for Dundalk for a tenth time.	
With the win, Dundalk claimed their third league and cup double.

Match

References

External links
Official Site

Final
FAI Cup finals
Fai Cup Final 2015B
Fai Cup Final 2015B
FAI Cup Final, 2015
FAI Cup Final